Mata Hari, Agent H21 (Italian:Mata-Hari, agente segreto H21) is a 1964 French-Italian spy film directed by Jean-Louis Richard and starring Jeanne Moreau, Jean-Louis Trintignant and Claude Rich. It portrays the activities of the First World War spy Mata Hari. Costumes by Pierre Cardin.

Synopsis
In Paris during the First World War, an exotic dancer called Mata Hari moves in the best circles and has affairs with influential men. In fact she is Grietje Zelle from the neutral Netherlands and spies for Germany. At a party she lures Captain François Lasalle, a French army officer, back to her apartment. Once he is asleep, her contact photographs key documents from his briefcase.

In their night together, François and Greitje have fallen in love. He wants to marry her, but she cannot break her contract with the Germans. When he goes back to the front, her contact gives her a new mission. She has to get into the office of another officer, Colonel Pelletier, and steal the plans of the ammunition depot he commands. After achieving this, with the help of her chauffeur Julien who is also in the pay of the Germans, she escapes into neutral Spain.

When German agents succeed in blowing up the depot, Greitje is offered a ticket to anywhere in the world. She nonplusses her handlers by saying she wants to go back to France, so they arrange for her payoff to be at a bank in Paris. In fact she wants to rejoin François, who she finds at the front. While they are making love in an abandoned building, it is infiltrated by a German patrol. François is killed, but she escapes. Making her way to Paris, she is arrested as she leaves the bank and, after a court martial, shot. Nobody claims her body.

Cast
 Jeanne Moreau as Mata Hari / Margaretha Geertruida Zelle 
 Jean-Louis Trintignant as Captain François Lasalle 
 Claude Rich as Julien the Chauffeur 
 Henri Garcin as Gaston, Mata-Hari's Lover 
 Georges Riquier as Ludovic 
 Frank Villard as Colonel Emile Pelletier / Legrand 
 Albert Rémy as Adam Zelle, Mata Hari's Father 
 Hella Petri as Baronne du Maine 
 Nicole Desailly as Charlotte, Mata-Hari's Maid 
 Carla Marlier as Ernestine, Mata-Hari's Maid 
 Jean-Marie Drot as German Spy Chief 
 Marcel Berbert as Detective Following Mata-Hari  
 Georges Géret as Soldier #2 
 Henri Coutet as Soldier  
 Charles Denner as Soldier #1  
 Max Desrau as Spectateur at the Alcazar  
 Van Doude as Policeman at the Bank's Entrance  
 Marie Dubois as Marie, the Young Girl 
 Yvette Etiévant as Nurse at the War Front  
 Édouard Francomme
 Marcel Gassouk as Policeman 
 Charles Lavialle
 Jean-Pierre Léaud as Absalon  
 Claude Mansard as Alcazar's Manager  
 Serge Rousseau 
 Pierre Tornade

See also
Mata Hari (1927)
Mata Hari (1931)
Mata Hari (1985)

References

Bibliography
 Craig, John S. Peculiar Liaisons: In War, Espionage, and Terrorism in the Twentieth Century. Algora Publishing, 2005.

External links
 
 

1964 films
1960s spy films
1960s historical films
1960s French-language films
French historical films
French spy films
Italian historical films
Italian spy films
Films scored by Georges Delerue
Films directed by Jean-Louis Richard
Films set in the 1910s
Cultural depictions of Mata Hari
1960s French films
1960s Italian films